The Magic Roundabout (known as Pollux – Le manège enchanté in France) is a 2005 computer-animated adventure fantasy film based on the television series of the same name. It was released in France with a French dub on 2 February 2005, and an English-language version was released two weeks later in the United Kingdom on 11 February.

In the United States, the film was released as Doogal on 24 February 2006 with a new English dub and script. Only Ian McKellen's performance was retained, while Kylie Minogue redubbed her role from the UK release. The U.K. and French dub received mixed reviews but the U.S. dub received overwhelmingly negative reviews.

Plot 
The wizard Zebedee, a red jack-in-the-box-like creature, is having a nightmare about the ice villain named Zeebad. Dougal the well-meaning cheeky, slacker dog places a tack in the road to pop a sweet cart's tyre, hoping to be rewarded with sweets for watching the cart. After the driver goes for help, Dougal accidentally crashes the cart into the magic roundabout at the centre of the village. Zeebad, the evil blue ice jack in the box-like creature, emerges from the top and flies away, followed by a Foot Guard figurine thrown off the roundabout. The roundabout freezes over, trapping repairman Mr Rusty, Dougal's young owner Florence, and two other children named Coral and Basil within an icy cell.

The horrified villagers, who are all animals, call upon Zebedee for help. He explains that the roundabout was a mystical prison for Zeebad. With it broken, Zeebad is free to work his magic on the world again as he once did before by starting the Ice Age. The only way to stop Zeebad freezing the world is by collecting three magic diamonds (one of which is supposed to be hidden on the roundabout, while the other two are hidden at separate locations far beyond the village). Slotting the diamonds onto the roundabout will re-imprison Zeebad and undo his magic, but if Zeebad retrieves them first then their power will allow him to freeze the Sun itself. Zebedee sends Dougal, Brian the cynical snail, Ermintrude the opera-singing cow and Dylan the hippie rabbit, to accomplish this mission along with a magic train. Meanwhile, Zeebad crash lands after escaping the roundabout, and animates the Foot Guard figurine, Sam the Soldier, to help him find the enchanted diamonds. Meanwhile, Zebedee's fellowship makes camp in the icy mountains. Dougal wanders off during the night and is captured and imprisoned by Zeebad. Ermintrude breaks him out of his prison. Zebedee then shows up to battle Zeebad but loses the battle with Zeebad freezing him and collapsing the cliff on which he stands, causing him to fall to his death.

Mourning for their friend, Dougal and his friends embark to recover the diamonds. This task takes them to a lava-bordered volcano and an ancient temple filled with booby-traps and evil skeleton guards, but Zeebad captures both of these diamonds; leaving the only hope of stopping Zeebad by getting back to the roundabout and to the final diamond before Zeebad does. The gang and Train are chased outside the volcano by Zeebad in a drill-like vehicle, but they inadvertently crash into a buffer stop and are sent flying before crash-landing into the snow, injuring Train in the process. As a result, they are forced to leave the injured Train behind and return to the village on foot through the snowy barren wasteland the world is now freezing into. Zeebad, after having abandoned Sam the Soldier to die wounded in the snow, beats the gang to the now-frozen village, but is unable to find the third diamond anywhere. Sam then arrives on an elk, having realised that his true duty is to protect the roundabout against Zeebad, he tries to make a stand but is easily defeated. Having learned that Sam was in fact on the roundabout, Zeebad discovers that the third diamond is and always was hidden inside Sam, and removes it from him (ending Sam's life as a result).

Zeebad, with all three diamonds now in his possession, uses them to freeze the world by freezing the Sun. However, the gang finally reach the village, get to the diamonds, and put them into their places on the roundabout until only the third diamond is left. Though Zeebad beats the gang to the diamond and seemingly secures his victory, the timely arrival of a healed Train knocks the diamond out of Zeebad's reach and gives Dougal the chance to place it in the roundabout's final slot. Zeebad is now re-imprisoned, and the world is thawed, Zebedee is restored to his friends, villagers are freed, and the Sun shines again.

Of those trapped in the roundabout, a comatose Florence is revived by Dougal. As everyone goes for a ride on the roundabout, they discover that it does not work because Sam is lifeless. At this point, Sam is restored and then reverted to his inanimate form, and placed back on the roundabout which functions once again. Dougal now realises the true value of his friends and the good qualities of selflessness, courage, and humility.

Cast

Reception 
On Rotten Tomatoes, the UK version of the film received an aggregate score of 60% based on five reviews (three positive and two negative) with an average score of 5.14/10. Joe Utichi of FilmFocus wrote: "For all its undeniable promise, this take on The Magic Roundabout is just plain disastrous in its execution." Stella Papamichael of BBC Online stated that "the story isn't inherently funny, relevant, or convincing. Essentially it's too 'dumbed down', tragically bypassing the cheeky 60s subtext of the original TV show and sapping its nostalgia value". Time Out wrote: "The story’s clearly aimed at the Teletubbies fraternity who would never question a scenario as ridiculous as this ... granted, the level of computer animation isn’t exactly state-of-the-art, but it’s certainly florid enough to captivate undemanding five-year-olds ... Robbie Williams and Bill Nighy’s stoned rabbit help transform what should have been an unendurable fiasco into an, albeit forgettable, treat for toddlers. And toddlers only. William Thomas of Empire wrote: "this version is far slicker and attempts a bit of Hollywood-style action-adventure grandstanding, but it works both as a trip down memory lane and as an entertaining movie for (very) young children".

Doogal (United States) 

According to William H. Macy, Harvey Weinstein saw the film and decided to do an American version. On 24 February 2006, the film was released in the United States as Doogal and was produced by The Weinstein Company. In the US version, where audiences are not as familiar with the series, the majority of the British cast's voice work was dubbed by American celebrities such as Chevy Chase (Train), Jimmy Fallon (Dylan), Whoopi Goldberg (Ermintrude), William H. Macy (Brian), and Jon Stewart (Zeebad). Child actor Daniel Tay plays the titular character in the United States dub.

Only two original voices remained, those of Kylie Minogue and Ian McKellen; Minogue, however, re-voiced her own lines with an American accent. The United States version also adds Kevin Smith (Moose) and Judi Dench (narrator).

Reception 
Unlike its U.K. dub version, the film received overwhelmingly negative reviews from film critics and audiences. On Rotten Tomatoes, it received an aggregate score of 8% based on 49 reviews (4 "fresh" and 45 "rotten"). The consensus reads: "Overloaded with pop culture references, but lacking in compelling characters and plot, Doogal is too simple-minded even for the kiddies". It has a score of 23 out of 100 ("generally unfavorable") on Metacritic, and an F rating from Entertainment Weekly writing that "very young children should be angry... where is it written that 4-year-olds don't deserve a good story, decent characters, and a modicum of coherence?". It was placed number five on Ebert & Roeper's Worst of 2006. Screen Rant ranked it number 1 on its list of the twelve worst animated movies ever made.

Randy Miller of DVD Talk says that: "Doogal is, after all, one of the worst excuses for a children's film during this or any year ... Filled to the brim with pop culture references and other such gags that'll be even less funny a few years from now, it's like Shrek without the occasional bit of charm and surprise".

Michael Phillips of the Chicago Tribune described the film as "Eighty-five minutes you'll never get back." and also put it on his Worst of 2006 list. Frank Scheck of The Hollywood Reporter wrote, "The key frame animation, based on three-dimensional models, is rudimentary, with none of the characters proving visually arresting." Ned Martel of The New York Times wrote, "In Doogal setting the world right again involves a badly paced quest for three diamonds, assorted jokes that don't land, and a daringly incoherent climactic confrontation."

Audiences polled by CinemaScore gave the film an average grade of "B−" on an A+ to F scale.

Accolades

Home media 

The Magic Roundabout was released on DVD and VHS in the UK on 18 July 2005 by 20th Century Fox Home Entertainment (under Pathé). The DVD release included the option to play along with the film via a "Magical Mysteries Quiz Game" in which, at certain intervals, the viewer would answer questions relating to what they have seen; Tom Baker would provide narration during the game. Two questions had to be answered correctly at a time before the film could continue, with an aim to see how many questions the viewer can get right first time. The game could be played under two difficulties; "Starter" to get the viewer started, and "Smarter" which was slightly more difficult. The film was later re-released on a 2-disc Special Edition DVD with extra bonus material that includes an inside look at the history of the original 1964 series, two making-of featurettes, classic episodes of the original series in both English and French, design gallery, cast and crew biographies, theatrical trailer and a couple TV spots.

In 2006, 20th Century Fox Home Entertainment released a 3-movie DVD pack that contains The Magic Roundabout, Chicken Run and Robots.

The American version of the film, Doogal, was released on a double-sided DVD on 16 May 2006 by The Weinstein Company containing both the fullscreen and widescreen versions on each side.

In Canada, the country's distributor, Alliance Atlantis, released both the American version of the film nationally along with the original version dubbed in its European French language to DVD at the same time in Quebec (despite the country using a completely different French accent there). Alliance Atlantis' version of the US DVD has the same artwork that was used in the DVD release of the original English version of the film.

In 2008, The Magic Roundabout was released on Blu-ray exclusively in France featuring both the French and original English versions. Despite being sourced from a 2K English master, selecting the French audio track (or using the angle option) would show the credits in French sourced in its original DVD release, hence the low quality during it.

A couple years later, the Blu-ray was re-released as part of Fox Pathé Europa's "Sélection Blu-VIP" service where it contains a DVD copy of the film (in a plastic sleeve) as well as a booklet containing a catalog of Blu-ray releases from 20th Century Fox, Pathé, Metro-Goldwyn-Mayer and EuropaCorp along with a code on the back of it which can be used on the now-defunct 'Le Club BLU-VIP' website to earn points for merchandise for films released at the time (à la Disney Movie Rewards).

Cancelled sequel 
Before the film was released, a sequel to The Magic Roundabout was announced to be in development, with the voice cast expected to reprise their roles. However, Action Synthese closed their doors in 2013, effectively ending any chances of a sequel being made.

References

External links
  (The Magic Roundabout)
  (Doogal)
 
 
 
 
 
 

2005 films
2005 fantasy films
2005 computer-animated films
2000s children's adventure films
2000s children's fantasy films
2000s children's animated films
2000s fantasy adventure films
2000s English-language films
2000s French-language films
British computer-animated films
British children's adventure films
British animated fantasy films
British fantasy adventure films
British independent films
French computer-animated films
French children's films
French animated fantasy films
French children's fantasy films
French fantasy adventure films
French independent films
Animated films based on animated television series
Animated films about dogs
The Weinstein Company films
The Weinstein Company animated films
Films directed by Dave Borthwick
2000s American films
2000s British films
2000s French films
Pathé films